The 1955 Campeon de Campeones was the 14th Mexican Super Cup football one-leg  match played on 3 March 1955.

 League winners: Zacatepec
 Cup winners: América

Match details

References
- Statistics of Mexican Super Cup. (RSSSF)

Campeón de Campeones
1955–56 in Mexican football
March 1955 sports events in Mexico